Piper Laurie (born  Rosetta Jacobs; January 22, 1932) is an American actress. She is known for her roles in the films The Hustler (1961), Carrie (1976), and Children of a Lesser God (1986), all of which brought her Academy Award nominations. She is also known for her performances as Kirsten Arnesen in the original TV production of Days of Wine and Roses, and as Catherine Martell in the television series Twin Peaks, for which she won a Golden Globe Award in 1991.

Early life
Piper Laurie was born Rosetta Jacobs in Detroit, Michigan, the younger of two children (both girls) of Alfred Jacobs, a furniture dealer, and his wife, Charlotte Sadie ( Alperin) Jacobs. Her paternal grandparents were Jewish immigrants from Poland and her maternal grandparents were Jewish immigrants from Russia.

Laurie was delivered, according to her 2011 autobiography Learning to Live Out Loud, in a one-bedroom walk-up on Tyler Street in Detroit, where the family lived. Alfred Jacobs moved the family to Los Angeles, California, in 1938, where she attended Hebrew school. To combat her shyness, her parents provided her with weekly elocution lessons; this eventually led to minor roles at nearby Universal Studios.

Laurie's mother and grandmother placed Laurie's older sister in a sanitarium for her asthma. Laurie was sent along to keep her company.

Career
In 1949, Rosetta Jacobs signed a contract with Universal Studios, and changed her screen name to Piper Laurie, which she has used since then. Among the actors she met at Universal were James Best, Julie Adams, Tony Curtis, and Rock Hudson. Her breakout role was in Louisa, with Ronald Reagan, whom she dated a few times before his marriage to Nancy Davis. In her autobiography, she claimed that she lost her virginity to him. Several other roles followed: Francis Goes to the Races (1951, co-starring Donald O'Connor); Son of Ali Baba (1951, co-starring Tony Curtis); and Ain't Misbehavin' (1955, co-starring Rory Calhoun).

To enhance her image, Universal Studios told gossip columnists that Laurie bathed in milk and ate flower petals to protect her luminous skin. Discouraged by the lack of substantial film roles, she moved to New York City to study acting and to seek work on the stage and in television. She appeared in Twelfth Night, produced by Hallmark Hall of Fame; in Days of Wine and Roses with Cliff Robertson, presented by Playhouse 90 on October 2, 1958 (in the film version, their roles were taken over by Jack Lemmon and Lee Remick); and in Winterset, presented by Playhouse 90 in 1959.

She was lured back to Hollywood by the offer to co-star with Paul Newman in The Hustler, released in 1961. She played Newman's girlfriend, Sarah Packard, and for her performance, she received an Academy Award nomination for Best Actress. Substantial movie roles did not come her way after The Hustler, so she and her husband moved to New York. In 1964, she appeared in two medical dramas — as Alicia Carter in The Eleventh Hour episode "My Door Is Locked and Bolted", and as Alice Marin in the Breaking Point episode "The Summer House". In 1965, she starred in a Broadway revival of Tennessee Williams's The Glass Menagerie, opposite Maureen Stapleton, Pat Hingle, and George Grizzard.

Laurie did not appear in another feature film until she accepted the role of Margaret White in the horror film Carrie (1976). She received an Oscar nomination for Best Supporting Actress for her performance, and it, along with the commercial success of the film, relaunched her career. Her co-star Sissy Spacek praised her acting skill: "She is a remarkable actress. She never does what you expect her to doshe always surprises you with her approach to a scene."

In 1979, she appeared as Mary Horton in the Australian movie Tim opposite Mel Gibson. After her 1981 divorce, Laurie moved to California. She received a third Oscar nomination for her portrayal of Mrs. Norman in Children of a Lesser God (1986). The same year, she was awarded an Emmy for her performance in Promise, a television movie, co-starring James Garner and James Woods. She had a featured role in the Off-Broadway production of The Destiny of Me in 1992, and returned to Broadway for Lincoln Center's acclaimed 2002 revival of Paul Osborn's Morning's at Seven, with Julie Hagerty, Buck Henry, Frances Sternhagen, and Estelle Parsons.

In 1990–1991, she starred as the devious Catherine Martell in David Lynch's television series Twin Peaks. She also appeared in Other People's Money with Gregory Peck (1991), and in horror maestro Dario Argento's first American film Trauma (1993). She played George Clooney's character's mother on ER. In 1997, she appeared in the film A Christmas Memory with Patty Duke, and in 1998, she appeared in the sci-fi thriller The Faculty. She made guest appearances on television shows such as Frasier, Matlock, State of Grace, and Will & Grace. Laurie also appeared in Cold Case and in a 2001 episode of Law & Order: Special Victims Unit titled "Care", in which she played an adoptive mother and foster grandmother who killed one of the foster granddaughters in her daughter's charge and who abused her adoptive son and foster grandchildren.

She returned to the big screen for independent films, such as Eulogy (2004) and The Dead Girl (2006), opposite actress Toni Collette. In 2010 she played Rainn Wilson's mother in Hesher, and in 2018, she had a supporting role in White Boy Rick as the grandmother of the title character.

Personal life

Laurie was married to New York Herald Tribune entertainment writer and Wall Street Journal movie critic Joe Morgenstern. They met shortly after the release of The Hustler in 1961 when Morgenstern interviewed her during the film's promotion. They soon began dating, and nine months after the interview, they were married on January 21, 1962. When no substantial roles came her way after The Hustler, she and Morgenstern moved to Woodstock, New York. In 1971, they adopted a daughter, Anne Grace Morgenstern. In 1982, the couple divorced, after which she moved to the Hollywood area and continued working in films and television. She had previously dated actor and future US president Ronald Reagan.

In 1962, she was Harvard's Hasty Pudding Woman of the Year, and in 2000, she received the Spirit of Hope Award in Korea for her service during the Korean War. She appeared at the September 2014 Mid-Atlantic Nostalgia Convention in Hunt Valley, Maryland.

Laurie is a sculptor working in marble and clay and exhibits her work.

Awards
Laurie has been nominated for an Academy Award for her performances in three films:  The Hustler (1961), Carrie (1976) and Children of a Lesser God (1986). She won a Primetime Emmy Award for Outstanding Supporting Actress in a Miniseries or a Movie for her role in the 1986 TV movie Promise, opposite James Garner and James Woods. She also won a Golden Globe Award for Best Supporting Actress – Series, Miniseries or Television Film in 1991 for her role in Twin Peaks. In addition, she received several Emmy nominations, including one for playing Magda Goebbels, wife of Joseph Goebbels, in The Bunker, opposite Anthony Hopkins as Hitler; and for her role in the miniseries The Thorn Birds, two nominations for her work in Twin Peaks, as Catherine Martell, and a nomination for her guest appearance on Frasier.

Filmography

Film

Television

References

External links

Piper Laurie at Virtual History
Interview with Piper Laurie, August 25, 2014, Classic Film & TV Cafe
 
– Interview with Piper Laurie. The Spectrum, January, 2016.

1932 births
20th-century American actresses
21st-century American actresses
American film actresses
American people of Polish-Jewish descent
American people of Russian-Jewish descent
American television actresses
Art Students League of New York alumni
Best Supporting Actress Golden Globe (television) winners
Outstanding Performance by a Supporting Actress in a Miniseries or Movie Primetime Emmy Award winners
Jewish American actresses
Living people
Actresses from Detroit
People from Woodstock, New York
21st-century American Jews
United Service Organizations entertainers